Isognomostoma isognomostomos is a species of air-breathing land snail, a terrestrial pulmonate gastropod mollusk in the family Helicidae, the typical snails.

Distribution
This species is found in the Czech Republic, Latvia, Poland,  Slovakia, Ukraine and other countries.

References

Helicidae
Gastropods described in 1784